Henry Oliver Charles FitzRoy, 12th Duke of Grafton (born 6 April 1978), known as Harry Grafton, is an English peer and music promoter. He inherited the Dukedom of Grafton from his grandfather, Hugh FitzRoy, 11th Duke of Grafton, on 7 April 2011. He is also a direct male-line descendant of Charles II of England.

His farming estate and seat is Euston Hall, at Euston in Suffolk, near Thetford in Norfolk.

Early life
Grafton is the son of James Oliver Charles FitzRoy, Earl of Euston (1947–2009), and his wife, Lady Clare Amabel Margaret Kerr, one of the daughters of the 12th Marquess of Lothian.

His ancestor Henry FitzRoy, 1st Duke of Grafton (1663–1690), was a bastard son of King Charles II by his mistress Barbara Villiers. Grafton shares the surname FitzRoy (meaning "son of the king") with other natural lines descended from Charles II.

Educated at Harrow School and the University of Edinburgh, Grafton spent a post-graduate year at the Royal Agricultural College, Cirencester, studying estate management.

Career
From 2002 to 2004 Viscount Ipswich, as the Duke was then known, worked in the United States in music business management, as a radio host in Nashville, Tennessee, and in 2005–2006 as a merchandise coordinator for the Rolling Stones on the A Bigger Bang tour.

In 2007, he moved to London and in 2009, due to the death of his father, returned to Suffolk to help manage the  Euston Hall estate. He also gained the courtesy title of Earl of Euston, but decided to remain as Viscount Ipswich.

On 7 April 2011, the 11th Duke of Grafton died, aged 92, and his grandson the present Duke succeeded to the peerages and estates. He currently promotes live music events while modernising the farms of the estate.

Marriage and issue

On 14 August 2010, at Snowshill, Gloucestershire, Lord Ipswich, as he was still known, married Olivia Margaret Sladen. They are the parents of two sons and one daughter: 
 Alfred James Charles FitzRoy, Earl of Euston, heir apparent, born 26 December 2012 
 Lady Rosetta Christina Clare FitzRoy, born 20 July 2015 
 Lord Ralph Simon Lennox FitzRoy, born 16 March 2017

Arms

The Grafton coat of arms includes Charles II's royal arms crossed by a baton sinister. It is an accurate coat as the male lineage is royal and is quartered since the union of crowns and is only in non-succession to these due to illegitimacy.

References

 "Burke's Peerage and Baronetage"
 "Libro d'Oro della Nobiltà Italiana"
 http://www.telegraph.co.uk/news/obituaries/1506204/Susan-Priestley.html
 http://www.gsia.org.uk/reprints/1975/gi197509.pdf
 http://www.anusha.com/pafg193.htm#5173
 http://www.baronage.co.uk/bphtm-03/hogarth2.htm 

1978 births
Alumni of the University of Edinburgh
House of Stuart
112
Henry FitzRoy, 12th Duke of Grafton
People educated at Harrow School
Alumni of the Royal Agricultural University
English expatriates in the United States
English people of American descent
English people of Scottish descent
English people of Dutch descent
Schuyler family
Living people